Bolesławów may refer to the following places in Poland:
Bolesławów, Lower Silesian Voivodeship (south-west Poland)
Bolesławów, Łódź Voivodeship (central Poland)
Bolesławów, Gostynin County in Masovian Voivodeship (east-central Poland)
Bolesławów, Otwock County in Masovian Voivodeship (east-central Poland)
Bolesławów, Greater Poland Voivodeship (west-central Poland)
Bolesławów, Silesian Voivodeship (south Poland)